Piano Sonata No. 13 may refer to: 
Piano Sonata No. 13 (Beethoven)
Piano Sonata No. 13 (Mozart)